The second Godmanis cabinet was the government of Latvia from 20 December 2007 to 12 March 2009.  It was the second government to be led by Ivars Godmanis, who was also Prime Minister from 1990 to 1993.  It took office on 20 December 2007, after the resignation of Ivars Godmanis, succeeding the second Kalvītis cabinet, which had lasted from 2007 to 2009.  It was replaced by the second Dombrovskis cabinet on 3 November 2010, after the October 2010 election.

Government of Latvia
2007 establishments in Latvia
2008 in Latvia
2009 disestablishments in Latvia
Cabinets established in 2007
Cabinets disestablished in 2009